Salah Zakaria Hassan (born 24 April 1999), is a professional Qatari footballer who plays as a goalkeeper for Al-Duhail and the Qatar national football team.

International career
In August 2022, Zakaria made his first appearance for the Qatar national team against Jamaica. The match ended 1-1.

Honours

Club
Al-Duhail SC
Emir of Qatar Cup: 2022

References

External links

1999 births
Living people
Qatari footballers
Qatar youth international footballers
Qatari expatriate footballers
Al-Wakrah SC players
K.A.S. Eupen players
Al-Gharafa SC players
Al-Duhail SC players
Qatar Stars League players
Association football goalkeepers
Qatari expatriate sportspeople in Belgium
Expatriate footballers in Belgium
Qatar under-20 international footballers
Qatar international footballers